The University City Symphony Orchestra is a non-profit community orchestra located in the St. Louis area. This is a partial listing of its programs during its 40+ year existence:

2007-2008 season

The 2007–2008 season has been announced and will consist of the following dates and repertoire:

March 30, 2008

 Two Latino Sketches 2004 - Benjamin
 Mid America Overture - Chamberlin
 Winners of the William Schatzkamer Young Artists Competition

March 7–9, 2008

 Peter and the Wolf - Prokofiev

February 3, 2008

 Das Lied von der Erde - Mahler

November 11, 2007

 Prometheus Overture - Beethoven
 Symphony No. 26 "Lamentation" - Haydn
 Sinfonia Concertante - Mozart

October 7, 2007

 Concerto No. 1 - Rachmaninoff
 Háry Yános Suite - Kodály

2006-2007 season

February 4 & 11, 2007

 Prelude to Die Meistersinger - Wagner
 Suite - "English Folk Songs" - Vaughan Williams
 Concerto for Oboe in C Major - Mozart
 Dr. John L. Walker-oboe
 Fantasia in C minor - Beethoven
 Rekha Dravina-piano
 St. Charles Community College Choir-Jan Parker, director
 East Central College Choir-Arturo Gonzalez, director

October 8, 2006

 Variations on "America" - Ives-Schuman
 Hungarian Rhapsody - Popper
Monica Godbee-cello
 Knoxville: Summer of 1915 - Barber
Gretchen Hewitt-soprano
 Symphony No. 2 in E minor - Rachmaninov
III Adagio
IV Allegro Vivace

2002-2003 season

March 23, 2003

 Concerto in D Major for Guitar and Strings - Vivaldi/Pujol
 Kirk Hanser-guitar
 Variations on Vivaldi's Guitar Concerto - Reuter
 Kirk Hanser-guitar
 Concierto de Aranjuez - Rodrigo
 John McClellan-guitar
 1492 Overture - Reuter
 Kirk Hanser-guitar
 Capriccio espagnol - Rimsky-Korsakov

2001-2002 season

April 28, 2002

Overture to "A Midsummer Night's Dream" - Mendelssohn
Concerto for Piano and Orchestra, No. 2 - Shostakovitch
Sarah Stoltzfus-piano
Overture to William Tell - Rossini
Shéhérazade, Three Songs for Soprano and Orchestra - Ravel
Kellie Gregg-soprano
Othello Overture - Dvořák

1998-1999 season

April 25, 1999

 Fantasia on Hungarian Folk Tunes - Liszt
Queena Chi-piano
 Zigeunerweisen - Sarasate
Tessa Ruth Gotman-violin
 Hungarian Rhapsody - Popper
Ryan Murphy-cello
 An American in Paris - Gershwin
 Lincoln Portrait - Copland
Rev. William Gillespie-narrator

1993-1994 season

December 5, 1993

Overture to Candide - Bernstein
Suite in A for Orchestra, Op. 98b - Dvořák
Romanian Rhapsody No. 1, Op. 11 - Enescu
Concerto in E minor for Violin and Orchestra, Op. 64 - Mendelssohn
Takaoki Sugitani-violin

1992-1993 season

February 7, 1993

 Overture to Martha - von Flotow
 Symphony No. 1 in F minor, Op. 10 - Shostakovich
Concerto in A minor for Violin, Cello and Orchestra - Brahms
Adrian Walker-violin
Dianne Wachsman-cello

November 22, 1992

 Overture to The Merry Wives of WindsorNicolai
 Melodies from the opera La bohèmePuccini
 Two Slavonic Dances, Op. 46. Nos. 3 and 8Dvořák
 Concertino in E-flat for Clarinet and OrchestraWeber (Paul Garritson, clarinet)
 Highlights from Bye Bye BirdieStrouse
 South Pacific: Symphonic ScenarioRodgers

1991-1992 season

February 9, 1992

 Russian Easter Overture - Rimsky-Korsakov
 Variations on a Rococo Theme for Cello and Orchestra - Tchaikovsky
 Gena Taylor-cello
 Scheherazade - Rimsky-Korsakov

November 3, 1991

 Procession of the Nobles (from Mlada) - Rimsky-Korsakov
 Symphony No. 5 in D Major, Op. 107 "Reformation" - Mendelssohn
 Concerto in B minor for Cello and Orchestra, Op. 104 - Dvořák
 Aleksander Ciechanski-cello

American orchestras